The 2008 United States presidential election in Indiana took place on November 4, 2008, and was part of the 2008 United States presidential election. Voters chose 11 representatives, or electors to the Electoral College, who voted for president and vice president.

Indiana was won by Democratic nominee Barack Obama by 28,391 votes, a 1.03% margin of victory. Prior to the election, major news organizations considered the state as leaning toward Republican nominee John McCain or as a toss-up. On election day, Obama narrowly carried Indiana, which marked the first time a Democratic presidential nominee won Indiana since Lyndon B. Johnson in 1964. , this is the last time that the Democratic nominee carried Indiana, as well as the last time in which they carried Madison County, Spencer County, Starke County, Vanderburgh County, and Vermillion County, and the last time the state was decided by a single digit margin. Obama's 1,374,039 votes is the most received by a Democratic presidential candidate in the state's history. This is also the last time the state voted to the left of Missouri, North Carolina, Georgia, and Arizona. It is also the only time since 1916 in which it didn't vote for the same candidate as each of the High Plains states (Kansas, Nebraska, North Dakota, and South Dakota).

Primaries
On May 6, 2008, Indiana held its presidential primaries:
 2008 Indiana Democratic presidential primary
 2008 Indiana Republican presidential primary

Campaign

Predictions
There were 16 news organizations who made state-by-state predictions of the election. Their last predictions before election day were:

Polling

Pre-election polling was always tight, although McCain generally had a slight lead in 3 poll averages throughout the entire general election, including the final weeks of the election. Rasmussen Reports never had Obama winning a state poll. In the last opinion polling before the election, conducted by Public Policy Polling (October 31-November 2, 2008), Barack Obama led John McCain 49% to 48%. The final 3 poll average gave McCain the lead 49% to 46%, with undecided voters deciding the election.

Fundraising
John McCain raised a total of $1,758,471 in the state. Barack Obama raised $3,400,475.

Advertising and visits
Obama massively outspent McCain in this state. Obama and his interest groups spent $17,796,704. McCain and his interest groups spent $3,160,264. The Democratic ticket visited this state 8 times. The Republican ticket visited 5 times.

Analysis
Historically, Indiana has been the most Republican state in the Great Lakes region. However, polling in September and October showed that Indiana was possibly turning into a swing state in 2008. George W. Bush easily captured Indiana's 11 electoral votes in 2004, defeating Democrat John Kerry by more than 20%. In contrast, most polls from the summer of 2008 onward showed only single-digit margins.

The race was as close as expected. Indiana's polls closed at 6 p.m. local time. The state has often been among the first to be called for the Republican candidate; in 2004, for instance, the state was called for Bush almost as soon as the polls in the Central Time Zone portion of the state closed.  However, the race for the state was too close to call at 6pm, sending an early signal of potential upset to voters throughout the rest of the country. Indiana still had not been decided when most media outlets declared Obama president-elect at 11 p.m. Eastern time. Indiana was finally called for Senator Obama at around 6 a.m. Eastern on November 5. Ultimately, Obama ended up carrying Indiana with 1,374,039 votes to John McCain's 1,345,648 votes, a difference of 28,391 votes (approximately 1.03% of the total votes cast). The Libertarian candidate polled 29,257 votes - more than the margin of Obama's win. The result was widely seen as an upset considering Indiana's status as a traditionally Republican state. Obama won the contest with a mixture of excellent ground game and internet-powered outreach to potential voters. The efficient use of social media on a scale never seen before in presidential politics also played a role.

At the same time as Obama captured Indiana's 11 electoral votes, incumbent Republican Governor Mitch Daniels was reelected to a second term with 57.84% of the vote over Democrat Jill Long Thompson who received 40.04%. Libertarian Andy Horning received 2.12%. At the state level, Democrats picked up one seat in the Indiana House of Representatives.

After 2008, Indiana quickly returned to being a solidly red state, voting Republican by double-digit margins in every presidential election since. This set it apart from Virginia and North Carolina, the other two states that Obama was the first Democrat to win in several decades. Virginia continued to vote Democratic in presidential elections and to become increasingly Democratic at the state level as well. North Carolina returned to supporting Republican candidates in subsequent elections, but only by relatively narrow margins, with it being considered a key battleground in every presidential election thereafter.

Obama won only 15 of Indiana's counties compared to 77 for McCain. However those 15 counties make up 44% of the state's population. Obama carried the state largely by trouncing McCain in Marion County, home to increasingly Democratic Indianapolis, by over 106,000 votes. Kerry narrowly won Marion County in 2004; prior to that it last supported a Democrat in 1964. Obama also won in Vigo County, home to Terre Haute and a noted bellwether; it had voted for the winner of every presidential election all but twice since 1892 (the streak ended in 2020). Not a single county voted more Republican in the 2008 election than in 2004. Although Obama lost Allen County, home to Indiana's second largest city, Fort Wayne, by four points, he won in Fort Wayne city proper by 6 points.

Obama also dominated Gary and northwestern Indiana, traditionally the most Democratic region of the state. Many of the voters in this area already knew Obama, as this region makes up most of the Indiana side of the Chicago metropolitan area and the Chicago media market; Obama is from Chicago and has aired ads here for over a decade (dating to his tenure in the Illinois Senate). He also did very well in counties where colleges and universities are located, including St. Joseph (home to South Bend and Notre Dame), Vigo (home to Terre Haute and Indiana State University, Rose–Hulman Institute of Technology, and Saint Mary-of-the-Woods College) Monroe (home to Bloomington and IU), Delaware (home to Muncie and Ball State), Tippecanoe (home to West Lafayette and Purdue), and Porter (home to Valparaiso and Valparaiso University).

McCain dominated Indianapolis's traditionally heavily Republican suburbs, although Obama reduced the Republican margin from past presidential elections. McCain also did well in traditionally Democratic Southern Indiana.  Obama only managed to win three counties in this region, one of which was Vanderburgh County, where the city of Evansville is located.

Results

By county

Counties that flipped from Republican to Democratic
 Delaware (largest city: Muncie)
 Madison (largest city: Anderson)
 Perry (largest city: Tell City)
 Porter (largest city: Portage)
 Spencer (largest city: Santa Claus)
 Starke (largest city: Knox)
 St Joseph (largest city: South Bend)
 Tippecanoe (largest city: Lafayette)
 Vanderburgh (largest city: Evansville)
 Vermillion (largest city: Clinton)
 Vigo (largest city: Terre Haute)

By congressional district
Although Barack Obama narrowly won the state and its 11 electoral votes, John McCain carried 6 out of 9 congressional districts in Indiana, including two held by Democrats.

Electors

Technically the voters of Indiana cast their ballots for electors: representatives to the Electoral College. Indiana is allocated 11 electors because it has 9 congressional districts and 2 senators. All candidates who appear on the ballot or qualify to receive write-in votes must submit a list of 11 electors, who pledge to vote for their candidate and his or her running mate. Whoever wins a plurality of votes in the state is awarded all 11 electoral votes. Their chosen electors then vote for president and vice president. Although electors are pledged to their candidate and running mate, they are not obligated to vote for them. An elector who votes for someone other than his or her candidate is known as a faithless elector.

The electors of each state and the District of Columbia met on December 15, 2008, to cast their votes for president and vice president. The Electoral College itself never meets as one body. Instead the electors from each state and the District of Columbia met in their respective capitols.

The following were the members of the Electoral College from the state. All 11 were pledged to Barack Obama and Joe Biden:
Jeffrey L. Chidester
Butch Morgan 
Michelle Boxell 
Charlotte Martin 
Jerry J. Lux
Connie Southworth
Alan P. Hogan 
Myrna E. Brown 
Clarence Benjamin Leatherbury
Daniel J. Parker 
Cordelia Lewis Burks

See also
 United States presidential elections in Indiana

References

Indiana
President
2008